Game addiction or gaming addiction may refer to:
 Problem gambling, repetitive gambling behavior despite harm and negative consequences, or a desire to stop
 Video game addiction, the problematic, compulsive use of video games that results in significant impairment to an individual's ability to function in various life domains over a prolonged period of time